The Atoning is a 2017 American supernatural horror independent film written and directed by Michael Williams.

Premise
Vera, Ray, and Sam, a seemingly normal family, are haunted by more than mere ghosts. The lingering horror of their past threatens their ability to function as a loving family until they become enlightened by a virgin ghost who wants Vera.

Cast
 Virginia Newcomb as Vera
 Cannon Bosarge as Sam
 Michael LaCour as Ray
 Alex Zuko as John
 Sherri Eakin as Sara
 Ashlyn Lopez as Julie
 Jessy Hughes as Vanessa
 Bryan Benfield as Momus
 Kyle Wigginton as Zepar
 Nikki Caruso as Asmodeus
 Dorothy Weems as Charon
 Stella Allen as Abby
 Caroline Delatte as Joni
 Chris Bosarge as Uncle Danny
 Todd Barnett as Cody
 Christi Dubois as Mel
 Joni Seitz as Real Estate Agent

Production
The film was shot entirely on location in West Point, Mississippi at the home of co-producer Joni Seitz.

Release
Following a preview screening on February 2, 2017 at Malco Cinema in Columbus, Mississippi, the film premiered at the Oxford Film Festival on February 18, 2017. It screened at the Magnolia Independent Film Festival on March 4, 2017, where it won the Best Home Grown award. It screened and won the Best Feature award at the Azalea Film Festival on April 1, 2017. The film was picked up for distribution by Gravitas Ventures on May 11, 2017. It was released on Blu-ray, DVD and digital download on September 5, 2017.

Critical reception
The film received mixed-to-positive reviews, with critics praising the performances, cinematography, directing and originality. Review aggregator Rotten Tomatoes reports an approval rating of 67%, with an average rating of 6.90/10, based on 6 reviews. Patrick King, in his review for Cultured Ventures, said "The Atoning almost becomes arthouse horror, but there’s enough B-movie sensibilities about the piece for it to appeal to horror fans of all sorts. The movie is ultimately about the secrets we keep buried, those things we don’t want to face, but we must face, if we want to make spiritual progress. Clearly a passion project, The Atoning is a very good indie horror flick that’s definitely worth checking out.

Jennie Kermode of Eye For Film gave the film 3 stars out of 5 and praised Cannon Bosarge's performance, writing "Having less information to work with than his parents, Sam might be expected to be the least interesting character, but Bosarge does a lot with the role and his naturalness helps to give the film an edge that no amount of over-familiar moody lighting can achieve. When his ghostly visions reveal something sinister, it's much easier to feel fear and concern than it is to connect with the consciously remote adults."

Frank Ochieng of Critical Movie Critics commended Michael Williams' use of creativity to bring something new to the horror genre, by saying "Thoroughly engaging, contemplative and percolating with loads of mystique, Williams brings some much needed punch and polish to his low-key goosebumps thriller that legitimately keeps the viewer guessing on their toes. Refreshingly startling in its quieted chaos of eeriness and somber moodiness, The Atoning is surprisingly strategic in its creepy presentation (despite its familiarity in theme), while never falling victim to the overwrought “gotcha moments” seen countless times before in other exaggerated, bloated fright-fests."

Jacqui Blue of Film Inquiry was critical of the film, saying "There’s a leak in the kitchen and a painting that Vera keeps putting away in the attic, which keeps reappearing on the wall. Nothing gets resolved, it just keeps repeating, slowly but surely. It’s always the same day all over again with repetitive actions, with the same mishaps and struggles of not being able to fix what’s broken, things that don’t stay where they’re put, and doors which don’t open."

Alternate titles
Brazil: Segredos ObscurosGermany: Dämon - Dunkle VergangenheitMexico: Delitos OcultosPeru: Apariciones extrañas

Awards
 Best Feature Film, Azalea Film Festival (2017)
 Best Home Grown Film, Magnolia Independent Film Festival (2017)
 2nd Place for Suspense-Thriller, International Horror Hotel Film Festival (2017)
 Ron Tibbett Award for Best Mississippi Film, Tupelo Film Festival (2017)
 1st Place Feature Film, Tupelo Film Festival (2017)
 Best Actress (Virginia Newcomb), FestivalSouth Film Expo
 Best Cinematography, FestivalSouth Film Expo
 Best Feature Film, FestivalSouth Film Expo

References

External links
 
 
 

2017 films
2017 horror films
2017 independent films
American independent films
Films directed by Michael Williams (film director)
Films shot in Mississippi
American supernatural horror films
2010s English-language films
2010s American films